Predrag Ejdus (24 July 1947 – 28 September 2018) was a Serbian actor of theater, film and television. His extensive body of work includes over 200 theater productions, 50 films and 30 television series.

Ejdus received numerous acting awards including the Statuette of Joakim Vujić in 2004 and Dobričin prsten in 2008.

Life

Ejdus was born on 24 July 1947 in Belgrade, Yugoslavia (now Serbia) to a Jewish father and a Serb mother. He later married and had a daughter and a son.

Between 1985 and 1989, Ejdus was president of the Society of Theater Artists of Serbia, and in 1993 he joined the ensemble of the Yugoslav Drama Theatre. He died on 28 September 2018 in Belgrade.

References

External links

 Predrag Ejdus: Lako je izgubiti ljudskost (in Serbian). Večernje novosti. Radmila Radosavljević; 24-12-2011
 Fudbal mi pomogao da stanem na noge (in Serbian). Politika. Slavko Trošelj; 13-07-2008

1947 births
2018 deaths
Male actors from Belgrade
Serbian male actors
Serbian people of Jewish descent
People of Latvian-Jewish descent
Laureates of the Ring of Dobrica